BJG may refer to:
 the ISO 639-3 code for Bijago language
 the IATA code for Bolaang Airport, Indonesia
 Briahna Joy Gray, an American lawyer and political pundit